Ruel is an unincorporated community in geographic Blewett Township in the Unorganized North Part of Sudbury District in Northeastern Ontario, Canada. The community is on the Opikinimika River, part of the James Bay drainage basin, just over the height of land between the latter basin and the Great Lakes Basin.

Ruel railway station is on the Canadian National Railway transcontinental main line and was named for Gerard Ruel, Assistant Solicitor for the Canadian Northern Railway (CNoR). It has a passing siding, and is served by Via Rail Canadian trains. The next community eastbound is Lapalmes, but the next served community is Felix (served by Felix railway station) one more community further east; the next community westbound is Stupart, but the next served community is Westree (served by Westree railway station) one more community further west.

References

Other map sources:

Communities in Sudbury District